Banco Ripley is a bank in Chile.

Overview
The bank was created in 2003. It is a subsidiary of Ripley S.A. and is headquartered in Santiago.

References

External links
Official website
Official Instagram

Banks of Chile
Banks established in 2003
2003 establishments in Chile